When We Were Lions is the debut EP by Charlie Simpson, confirmed to be followed by his first solo full-length debut album in 2011. In the live shows promoting Young Pilgrim he played 2 songs live from the EP which were "If I Hide Will You Come Looking?" and "Farmer & His Gun", which is also a bonus track and a live bonus track on the iTunes bonus tracks. During his Young Pilgrim World Tour he plays "When We Were Lions" and "Farmer & His Gun" as the encore. Simpson announced in January that he is releasing a video for the track "Bullet" from the EP. Despite being released 3 years prior, the single is just a one off.

Track listing

References

2010 debut EPs
Charlie Simpson albums